Norman Abbott (July 11, 1922 – July 9, 2016) was an American vaudevillian, actor, producer and television director. 

Abbott was born in New York City, where his uncle, comedian Bud Abbott, and his mother raised him. His early experience in entertainment was as a vaudeville performer, including summers working the 'borscht circuit" in resorts in the Catskill Mountains of New York.

In the early 1940s, he and Pat Costello (brother of Lou Costello) worked as stand-ins for the better-known act during filming of Who Done It? (1942).

During World War II, Abbott served as a member of the original United States Navy SEALs team.

After the war, Abbott became a dialog director on the Abbott and Costello films and was mentored by the team's director, Charles T. Barton. Abbott later directed episodes of The Jack Benny Program, Leave It to Beaver, Get Smart, The Munsters, Welcome Back, Kotter, Dennis the Menace, and Sanford and Son.

Abbott's obituary in The Hollywood Reporter described him as "the brainchild behind the Broadway sensation Sugar Babies, the comeback vehicle for Mickey Rooney in the late 1970s". He conceived the idea of a Broadway musical based on burlesque after inheriting his uncle's "treasure trove of burlesque material, including written gags, props, music and posters". Despite his having originated the concept, Abbott was fired as director of the show after two weeks of rehearsing.

Abbott died in Valencia, California, on July 9, 2016, two days before his 94th birthday.

Filmography

References

External links

1922 births
2016 deaths
American television directors
United States Navy personnel of World War II
United States Navy SEALs personnel